Rissoina nivea is a species of minute sea snail, a marine gastropod mollusk or micromollusk in the family Rissoinidae.

Description
The height of the shell attains 6 mm.

Distribution
This species occurs in the Red Sea and in the Indian Ocean off Réunion.

References

 Vine, P. (1986). Red Sea Invertebrates. Immel Publishing, London. 224 pp.

External links
 

Rissoinidae